Robert "Bob" Atwater is a Democratic member of the North Carolina Senate, representing the 18th district from 2005 to 2013.

External links
 Project Vote Smart - Senator Robert 'Bob' Atwater (NC) profile
 Follow the Money - Bob Atwater
 2008 2006 2004 campaign contributions

North Carolina state senators
Living people
21st-century American politicians
Year of birth missing (living people)